Dale M. Burnett (January 23, 1908April 17, 1997) was an American football running back for the New York Giants of the National Football League. He attended Dodge City High School in Dodge City, Kansas.

References

1908 births
People from Larned, Kansas
American football running backs
Emporia State Hornets football players
New York Giants players
1997 deaths